The Canton of Troyes-3 is a canton of the Aube department, in northern France. Since the French canton reorganisation which came into effect in March 2015, the communes of the canton of Troyes-3 are:
La Chapelle-Saint-Luc
Troyes (partly)

References

Troyes-3
Troyes